Parvez Haleem Khan is Indian Politician, member of Janata Dal and Bharatiya Kranti Dal, representative of Kithore (Assembly constituency), 10th Legislative Assembly of Uttar Pradesh and 13th Legislative Assembly of Uttar Pradesh.

References 

Year of birth missing (living people)
Living people
Janata Dal politicians
Uttar Pradesh politicians
Uttar Pradesh MLAs 1989–1991
Uttar Pradesh MLAs 1997–2002